Albeiro Usuriaga López (12 June 1966 – 11 February 2004) was a Colombian professional footballer who played as a striker.

Nicknamed El Palomo, he played professionally in Colombia, Spain, Argentina, Mexico, Ecuador, Brazil, Paraguay and Venezuela, before being murdered at the age of 37.

Club career
Usuriaga first came to prominence with Medellín's Atlético Nacional, scoring four goals in a 6–0 win against Danubio F.C. for the 1989 edition of the Libertadores Cup and adding another against Club Olimpia in the final (2–0 in the second leg in Paraguay), in an eventual penalty shootout win. goalkeeper René Higuita was amongst his teammates.

After playing two season halves in Spain with CD Málaga – Málaga CF's predecessor – and having a three-year spell with América de Cali, Usuriaga rarely settled with a team and continuously changed countries, appearing for Club Atlético Independiente (two stints), Club Necaxa, Barcelona Sporting Club, Santos FC, Club Deportivo Los Millonarios, Atlético Bucaramanga, General Paz Juniors, All Boys, Deportivo Pasto, Club Sportivo Luqueño and Carabobo FC.

In the 1993–94 season, Usuriaga contributed with four goals as Argentina's Independiente won the Clausura tournament. Three years later, whilst with the same team, he was handed a two-year ban by the Argentine Football Association after testing positive for cocaine. After playing in various levels of football, he retired from the game in 2003, at the age of 37.

International career
Usuriaga gained 15 caps for Colombia, during three years. His only international goal came during the 1990 FIFA World Cup qualification playoffs against Israel, the only goal in the two legs.

Usuriaga was later, however, omitted from the final squad in Italy due to disciplinary problems.

Death
On 11 February 2004, 37-year-old Usuriaga was gunned down while playing a card game in a nightclub district in his hometown of Cali, in unclear circumstances. It later surfaced he was murdered by hired killers, ordered by criminal Jefferson Valdez Marín who was dating his former girlfriend.

See also
List of sportspeople sanctioned for doping offences

References

External links

1966 births
2004 deaths
Footballers from Cali
Colombian footballers
Association football forwards
Categoría Primera A players
América de Cali footballers
Deportes Tolima footballers
Cúcuta Deportivo footballers
Atlético Nacional footballers
Millonarios F.C. players
Atlético Bucaramanga footballers
Deportivo Pasto footballers
La Liga players
Segunda División players
CD Málaga footballers
Atlético Malagueño players
Argentine Primera División players
Club Atlético Independiente footballers
General Paz Juniors footballers
All Boys footballers
Liga MX players
Club Necaxa footballers
Barcelona S.C. footballers
Campeonato Brasileiro Série A players
Santos FC players
Sportivo Luqueño players
Carabobo F.C. players
Colombia international footballers
1991 Copa América players
Colombian expatriate footballers
Expatriate footballers in Spain
Expatriate footballers in Argentina
Expatriate footballers in Mexico
Expatriate footballers in Ecuador
Expatriate footballers in Brazil
Expatriate footballers in Paraguay
Expatriate footballers in Venezuela
Colombian expatriate sportspeople in Spain
Colombian expatriate sportspeople in Argentina
Colombian sportspeople in doping cases
Doping cases in association football
Male murder victims
Colombian murder victims
People murdered in Colombia
Deaths by firearm in Colombia
20th-century Colombian people
21st-century Colombian people